Amor de hombre (also known as Love of a Man in English-speaking markets) is a 1997 Spanish gay-themed drama film directed by Yolanda García Serrano and Juan Luis Iborra. An intimate, warm and tender Spanish film about the very close friendship between a gay man and a straight woman.

The film won both the Audience and Jury awards at the Miami Gay and Lesbian Film Festival and Narrative Feature at the Austin Gay & Lesbian Film Festival.

Plot
Ramón is a sexually active gay man with men coming and going from his bedroom. His best friend Esperanza is a single woman who can't seem to meet or like any men unless they are gay. Some would call Esperanza a fag hag, but she simply has great taste in men, she likes them gay! They go out together to the bars and Ramon always brings a man home while Esperanza goes home to an empty bed. She doesn't mind because she knows that she has Ramón's heart. That is until Ramón meets her fellow teacher, Roberto. Their relationship endangers the precious bond these two have formed.

This colorful and somewhat hyper-active film is in the style of Almodóvar. There's always plenty of on-screen action, dialogue and color to keep the eyes and ears happy. It's a tender and intimate peek into the lives of two people that one seldom sees on screen. It seems as if Madrid is teeming with gorgeous gay men, after seeing Amor de Hombre it should be a stop in every gay man's life.

Cast
Loles León as Esperanza
Andrea Occhipinti as Ramón
Pedro Mari Sanchez as César
Armando Del Rio as Roberto

Awards
Freedom Award - 2000 Outfest
Audience & Jury Award for Best Feature - 1999 Miami LG Film Festival
Best Narrative Feature - 1998 Austin GL Film Festival

Festivals
1999 Miami Lesbian & Gay Film Festival
1999 Philadelphia Gay and Lesbian Film Festival
23rd San Francisco LGBT Film Festival

External links
  TLA Releasing - Amor de Hombre

1997 films
1997 drama films
1990s Spanish-language films
Spanish LGBT-related films
Madrid in fiction
Gay-related films
LGBT-related drama films
Spanish drama films

1997 LGBT-related films
1990s Spanish films